Atsushi Yasuda (安田篤 Yasuda Atsushi; September 8, 1868 –  May 12, 1924) was a Japanese lichenologist. For a time, he was the only lichenologist in Japan.

Selected publications

References

1868 births
1924 deaths
Japanese lichenologists
20th-century Japanese botanists
University of Tokyo alumni
19th-century Japanese botanists